The Mentawai scops owl (Otus mentawi)  is endemic to larger islands of Mentawai, off west Sumatra, Indonesia.

References

BirdLife.org Species Factsheet: Otus mentawi (Mentawai scops owl)
Owl Pages.com: Mentawai scops owl

Mentawai scops owl
Mentawai scops owl
Birds of Sumatra
Mentawai scops owl
Near threatened animals
Near threatened biota of Asia
Mentawai scops owl
Mentawai scops owl